Peder Skram, a 16th-century Danish admiral.

Peder Skram may also refer to:
 Danish ironclad Peder Skram, a Danish armored frigate
 Peder Skram class frigate, a Danish frigate class
 Peder Skram (F 352), a Danish frigate
 Peder Skram (coastal defence ship), a coastal battleship of Herluf Trolle class